= Sodium/hydrogen exchanger 4 =

Protein-coding gene in the species Homo sapiens

SLC9A4

Identifiers
- Aliases: SLC9A4, NHE4, solute carrier family 9 member A4
- External IDs: OMIM: 600531; MGI: 105074; GeneCards: SLC9A4

Gene location (Human)
Chr.	Chromosome 2 (human)
Band	2q12.1	Start	102,473,226 bp
Band	2q12.1	End	102,533,972 bp

Gene location (Mouse)
Chr.	Chromosome 1 (mouse)
Band	1 B|1 19.51 cM	Start	40,619,241 bp
Band	1 B|1 19.51 cM	End	40,669,885 bp
RNA expression pattern
Bgee	Human / Mouse (ortholog); Top expressed in: testicle; stomach; body of stomach; human kidney; fundus; gallbladder; duodenum; gastric mucosa; olfactory zone of nasal mucosa; tonsil / Top expressed in: stomach; dentate gyrus of hippocampal formation granule cell; secondary oocyte; zygote; duodenum; primary oocyte; hippocampus proper; urinary bladder; olfactory bulb; mammary gland; More reference expression data
BioGPS	n/a
Gene ontology
Molecular function	solute:proton antiporter activity; antiporter activity; sodium:proton antiporter activity; potassium:proton antiporter activity
Cellular component	integral component of membrane; basolateral plasma membrane; apical plasma membrane; membrane; plasma membrane
Biological process	gastric acid secretion; proton transmembrane transport; epithelial cell development; cation transport; ion transport; regulation of pH; sodium ion transport; regulation of intracellular pH; sodium ion import across plasma membrane; potassium ion transmembrane transport; transmembrane transport; anion transmembrane transport
Sources:Amigo / QuickGO
Orthologs
Databases	NCBI: entry; OMA: entry
Species	Human	Mouse
Entrez	389015	110895
Ensembl	ENSG00000180251	ENSMUSG00000026065
UniProt	Q6AI14	Q8BUE1
RefSeq (mRNA)	NM_001011552	NM_177084
RefSeq (protein)	NP_001011552	NP_796058
Location (UCSC)	Chr 2: 102.47 – 102.53 Mb	Chr 1: 40.62 – 40.67 Mb
PubMed search
- Wikidata
View/Edit Human	View/Edit Mouse

Sodium/hydrogen exchanger 4, also known as solute carrier family 9 member A4 is a protein that in humans is encoded by the SLC9A4 gene.
